Transmutation may refer to:

Pseudoscience and science

Alchemy
Chrysopoeia and argyropoeia, the turning of inexpensive metals, such as lead or copper, into gold and silver
Magnum opus (alchemy), the creation of the philosopher's stone 
 Mental transmutation, a Hermetic term

Biology
Biological transmutation, the claim that nuclear transmutation occurs within living organisms
Transmutation of species, the alteration of one species into another

Physics
Dimensional transmutation, a physical mechanism in particle physics that transforms a pure number into a parameter with a dimension
Nuclear transmutation, the conversion of one chemical element or isotope into another through nuclear reaction

Psychology
Sexual transmutation or sexual sublimation, an attempt to transform sexual energy into creativity and thereby facilitate spiritual awakening

Arts and entertainment

Film and television
Transmutations (film) (also called Underworld), a 1985 film with story and screenplay by horror-writer Clive Barker
Transmutate, a fictional character in the Beast Wars franchise

Music
Transmutation (album), a 2008 album by the Brazilian death metal band Ophiolatry
Transmutation (Mutatis Mutandis), a 1992 album by the supergroup Praxis
Transmutator, an alternative name for the electronic music group Razed in Black
Transmute (album), a 2021 album by Press to Meco

See also
Mutation (disambiguation)
Transformation (disambiguation)
Transmutant, a 2015 album by Katie Noonan
Transubstantiation, a dogma of the Eucharist in Catholic theology